The Cowboy Way may refer to:
 The Cowboy Way (film), a 1994 action comedy film
 The Cowboy Way (album) by Riders in the Sky
  The Cowboy Way (TV series), INSP original reality TV show about cowboys and ranching